Ajay Kumar Mandal is an Indian politician. He was elected to the Lok Sabha, lower house of the Parliament of India from Bhagalpur in the 2019 Indian general election as member of the Janata Dal (United). He defeated Rashtriya Janata Dal candidate Shailesh Kumar Mandal by a big margin of 2,77,630 votes.  He has been also elected three times for Bihar Legislative Assembly, two times from Nathnagar (Vidhan Sabha constituency) and one time from Kahalgaon (Vidhan Sabha constituency).

References

India MPs 2019–present
Lok Sabha members from Bihar
Janata Dal (United) politicians
Living people
Year of birth missing (living people)